Café Psychologique is a grassroots public discussion initiative where people who are interested in psychology and psychological ways of thinking meet to discuss issues that are important to them.

Philosophy 

Café Psychologique follows the philosophy of Café Scientifique in using invited experts and a discussion-based format to make specialist subjects accessible to a lay audience.

Café Psychologique is intended to bring the insights and methods of psychological therapies into accessible public spaces. The UK's Café Psychologique movement was set up by a group analyst  and adheres to the principles of group analysis by promoting a culture where groups can meet and talk in a way that benefits the participants and promotes psychological well-being.

Format 

The café-based format is a combination of world café and Pub Philosophy.

Visiting experts introduce a theme for the session, and then participants discuss issues surrounding the theme as a large group. Guest therapists and psychologists participate in the discussions as invited.

History

The UK's first Café Psychologique started in 2011 and meets in the Severn Arts Centre, Leeds. Other UK Café Psychologiques include Liverpool, Wolverhampton and Manchester. There is also a Cafe Psychologique in Sydney, Australia.

See also 

 Café philosophique
 Café Scientifique
 Collective intelligence
 Group analysis
 Public awareness of science

References

Scientific organisations based in the United Kingdom
Psychology organisations based in the United Kingdom
Organizations established in 2011